Luciano Borgognoni (12 October 1951 – 2 August 2014) was an Italian cyclist. As an amateur he won the 4000 m team pursuit event at the 1971 World Championships and placed fifth and ninth in the individual and team pursuit at the 1972 Summer Olympics, respectively. After the Olympics he became professional road racer and won the Giro del Friuli and one stage in the Giro di Sardegna in 1974. He rode the Giro d’Italia in 1973–82 and won two stages in 1977. He failed to complete the 1976 Tour de France.

Major results

Road

1971
 1st Stages 4 (TTT) & 5 Giro della Valle d'Aosta
1972
 1st Giro dei Tre Laghi
 1st Stage 6 Giro Ciclistico d'Italia
1974
 1st Giro del Friuli
 2nd Overall Giro di Sardegna
1st Stage 4
 7th Giro di Romagna
 8th Tre Valli Varesine
1975
 1st GP Cemab
 5th Giro del Veneto
 5th Coppa Bernocchi
 6th Overall Giro di Sardegna
 7th Tre Valli Varesine
 10th Trofeo Matteotti
1977
 1st Stages 2b & 22 Giro d'Italia
 1st Milano–Vignola
 2nd Giro di Romagna
 4th GP Montelupo
 8th Overall Tour Méditerranéen
1978
 1st Overall (TTT) Cronostaffetta
 10th Züri-Metzgete
1979
 6th Milan–San Remo

Grand Tour general classification results timeline

Track
1971
 1st  Team pursuit, UCI Amateur World Championships (with Giacomo Bazzan, Giorgio Morbiato & Pietro Algeri)
 1st  Individual pursuit, National Amateur Track Championships
1974
 1st  Individual pursuit, National Track Championships
1976
 1st  Individual pursuit, National Track Championships

References

External links
 

1951 births
2014 deaths
Italian male cyclists
Olympic cyclists of Italy
Cyclists at the 1972 Summer Olympics
People from Gallarate
Cyclists from the Province of Varese